The Amazing Race 24 (also known as The Amazing Race: All-Stars) is the twenty-fourth season of the American reality television show The Amazing Race. It featured eleven teams of two, each returning from a previous edition of The Amazing Race, competing in a race around the world.

The season premiered on CBS on February 23, 2014, and the season finale aired on May 18, 2014.

Father and son Dave and Connor O'Leary were the winners of this season, while country singers Caroline Cutbirth and Jennifer Wayne finished in second place, and Big Brother newlyweds Brendon Villegas and Rachel Reilly finished in third.

Production

Development and filming

Filming for the season began on November 16, 2013, at Cougar Stadium at the College of the Canyons in Santa Clarita, California. Filming was initially set to begin at the Rose Bowl, but was changed to Cougar Stadium due to "issues of availability to use the Rose Bowl." This season's course traveled , across three continents and nine countries, including a first-time visit to Wales.

Illusionist David Copperfield appeared in the first Roadblock during the finale in Las Vegas.

Casting 
Returning teams were selected from previous teams going as far back as season 14, including three teams competing for a third time.
Amani & Marcus from season 19 were contacted, but declined the invitation due to work commitments.
Art & J.J. from season 20 were originally selected, but were cut a few days before filming. They would later participate in season 31.
Tim & Marie from season 23 were originally selected, but declined the invitation.

Cast

Mark Jackson was originally set to compete with his original partner, Bopper Minton, but Bopper began showing signs of pancreatitis before arriving in Los Angeles for filming and was deemed unfit to compete by the production's medical team. As a last-minute replacement, Mallory Ervin was invited to fly from Nashville to compete as Mark's teammate. This marked the first time that a team without a pre-existing relationship competed on The Amazing Race.

Future appearances
Leo & Jamal and Rachel Reilly returned to compete on The Amazing Race: Reality Showdown. Caroline & Jennifer appeared as clue givers during the finale of season 34 in Nashville.

Not long after this season aired, Natalie and Nadiya Anderson competed on Survivor: San Juan del Sur, making them the first Amazing Race contestants to compete on another CBS reality show. Natalie returned to compete on Survivor: Winners at War. Nadiya also made an appearance as part of the loved ones visit. Natalie competed on the thirty-sixth season of the MTV reality show The Challenge, but withdrew in the fifth episode after learning that she was pregnant.

On May 25, 2016, Leo & Jamal, Flight Time & Big Easy, and Bopper & Mark appeared on an Amazing Race-themed primetime special episode of The Price is Right. Rachel Reilly appeared on a Big Brother-themed episode the day before, and Natalie Anderson appeared on a Survivor-themed episode two days prior. Flight Time & Big Easy also appeared on 100 Day Dream Home in 2021. In 2022, Leo competed on The Challenge: USA. In 2022, Rachel was a contestant on Snake in the Grass. She also competed on the 2023 Peacock reality TV series The Traitors.

Results
The following teams are listed with their placements in each leg. Placements are listed in finishing order. 
A  placement with a dagger indicates that the team was eliminated. 
An  placement with a double-dagger indicates that the team was the last to arrive at a pit stop in a non-elimination leg, and had to perform a Speed Bump task in the following leg. 
 A  indicates that the team used an Express Pass on that leg to bypass one of their tasks.
 A  indicates that the team used the U-Turn and a  indicates the team on the receiving end of the U-Turn.

Notes

Race summary

Leg 1 (United States → China)

Episode 1: "Back in the Saddle" (February 23, 2014)
Prize: Two Express Passes (awarded to Jet & Cord; one for themselves and the other to be given to another team)
Eliminated: Natalie & Nadiya
Locations
Santa Clarita, California (College of the Canyons – Cougar Stadium) (Starting Line)
 Los Angeles → Guangzhou, China
Guangzhou (Jiangnan Avenue North  – Precious One, Silver Gorgeous,  Rich Forest & Beauty)
Guangzhou (Canton Tower)
Guangzhou (Haixinsha Stadium) 
Guangzhou (Guangzhou Opera House) 
Episode summary
At Cougar Stadium, teams had to find one of several UCLA Bruin Marching Band members with the Chinese symbols for Guangzhou –  – on their shako, matching the badges displayed on the shakos of the field commanders, and bring the band member to Phil Keoghan. The first four teams who found a band member with the correct shako received tickets on the Cathay Pacific flight to Guangzhou, China. It arrived one hour before the EVA Air flight, which carried the remaining seven teams. 
After arriving in Guangzhou, teams went to the city's wedding boutique district and searched for one of three boutiques that had their next clue. Each store had only a limited number of clues, which directed teams to find "the building with the bubbles on top", giving them a replica "bubble", and they had to figure out that it referred to the Canton Tower.
At the Canton Tower, teams had to select one of the bubble cars of the Ferris wheel located at the top of the tower and search for their clue, which was only revealed when the door to the car closed, forcing teams to wait for the car to make a full trip around the building before they could exit and proceed. Depending on which car they entered, the clue either informed teams to try another car or directed them to their next location: Haixinsha Stadium.
 In this season's first Roadblock, one racer had to perform five aerial somersaults while suspended  in the air attached by wires to the stadium's towers in order to receive their next clue.
Teams had to check in at the pit top: the Guangzhou Opera House.

Leg 2 (China)

Episode 2: "Baby Bear's Soup" (March 2, 2014)
Prize:  each (awarded to Brendon & Rachel)
Eliminated: Mark & Mallory
Locations
Guangzhou (Guangzhou Opera House) 
Guangzhou (Chen Clan Academy)
Guangzhou (Gate 5 Mall – Edaytown Guangzhou) 
Guangzhou (Guangzhou Children's Activities Center)
Guangzhou (Liwanhu Park   Sauna Center) 
Guangzhou (Shamian Island Promenade) 
Episode summary
At the beginning of this leg, teams went to the Chen Clan Academy, where they had to watch a martial arts demonstration. Afterwards, the master stamped the name of their next destination in Mandarin Chinese on the foreheads of both team members.
 In this leg's Roadblock, one team member had to correctly assemble a child's motorized car from a provided kit in order to receive their next clue. 
After completing the Roadblock, teams had to deliver the toy car they assembled to the Guangzhou Children's Activities Center in order to receive their next clue.
 This season's first Detour was a choice between Featherball or China Cup. In Featherball, teams had to play jianzi (a game similar to hackeysack) with two local players. Once the teams successfully volleyed the shuttlecock a combined ten times, they could receive their next clue. In China Cup, each team member had to receive a traditional massage involving cupping therapy in order to receive their next clue.
Teams had to check in at the pit stop: the Shamian Island Promenade in Guangzhou.
Additional notes
Caroline & Jennifer used their Express Pass to bypass the Roadblock on this leg.

Leg 3 (China → Malaysia)

Episode 3: "Welcome to the Jungle" (March 9, 2014)
Prize: A trip for two to Budapest, Hungary (awarded to Dave & Connor)
Eliminated: Joey & Meghan
Locations
Guangzhou (Shamian Island Promenade) 
 Guangzhou → Kota Kinabalu, Malaysia
Inanam (Kiansom Waterfall) 
Kiulu, Tuaran (Kampung Tompinahaton)
 Kiulu (Kampung Tombung  Kampung Linsuk) 
Kota Kinabalu (Tanjung Aru Water Village) 
Episode summary
At the beginning of this leg, teams were instructed to fly to Kota Kinabalu in Malaysian Borneo. There were only two available flights with limited seats from Guangzhou to Kota Kinabalu, so the first six teams to check in at the airport in Guangzhou left three hours before the last three teams. Once in Kota Kinabalu, teams had to make their way to the Kiansom Waterfall in Inanam.
 In this leg's Roadblock, one team member had to take their Travelocity Roaming Gnome, travel through the treetops on a safety line, and then rappel down the waterfall, collecting their next clue along the way.
After completing the Roadblock, teams had to travel to Kampung Tompinahaton in order to find their next clue.
 This leg's Detour was a choice between River Delivery or Run Through the Jungle. Before the Detour, teams had to build a bamboo raft, which they used to travel down the river to their Detour choice. In River Delivery, teams had to pick up several goods from a depot, carry them down river to the town of Kampung Tombung, and then deliver the goods to the village elder. In Run Through the Jungle, teams joined a Murut hunting guide who led them through the jungle to several fake bird targets. Using a blowgun, the teams had to each successfully knock over one target. After completing either Detour, teams were directed to return to their rafts and continue down river before receiving their next clue, which directed them to the pit stop: Tanjung Aru Water Village.

Leg 4 (Malaysia)

Episode 4: "Smarter, Not Harder" (March 16, 2014)
Prize: A trip for two to London, England (awarded to Jet & Cord)
Locations
Kota Kinabalu (Tanjung Aru Water Village) 
Kota Kinabalu (Prince Philip Park – Murut Longhouse) 
 Kota Kinabalu → Kuala Lumpur
Kuala Lumpur (Jalan Ampang Intersection)
Kuala Lumpur (Traders Hotel – Skybar) 
Gombak (Batu Caves – Lord Murugan Statue) 
Episode summary
At the beginning of this leg, teams had to make their way to the Murut Longhouse in Prince Philip Park, where they found their next clue.
 In this leg's Roadblock, one team member participated in a traditional Lansaran dance, in which the they bounced on a bamboo springboard with a group of locals. At the climax of the dance, the racer used the springboard to launch themselves high enough to grab a flag positioned above them, which they could exchange for their next clue. If more than one team was present, team members were only allowed three jumps before another team took their turn.
Teams were instructed to fly to Kuala Lumpur. Only three flights to Kuala Lumpur were available to the teams. The first three teams to check in at the airport in Kota Kinabalu were booked on the first flight, which left 90 minutes before the second flight that carried two teams, which itself was scheduled to leave 45 minutes before the last flight. However, the second flight suffered a 50-minute delay, putting it a few minutes behind the third flight. Once in Kuala Lumpur, teams had to make their way to the Jalan Ampang intersection, where they found their next clue beneath the Petronas Towers.
 This leg's Detour was a choice between Mix Master or Master Mix. In Mix Master, teams had to learn to scratch on a DJ table and then perform in front of a DJ and the crowd, receiving their next clue if each team member was able to replicate a series of seven record scratches to the DJ's approval. If teams did not perform the scratching properly, they had to allow other teams in line to perform before they could try again. In Master Mix, teams had to stack seven cocktail glasses into a two-tier pyramid and then use a stack of mixing glasses to pour differently colored cocktails into each glass simultaneously such that none of the cocktails mixed in order to receive their next clue.
Teams had to check in at the pit stop: the Lord Murugan Statue at the entrance to the Batu Caves in Gombak.
Additional notes
After pouring the drinks, teams were required to deliver a tray of cocktails before receiving their clue. This element of the task was unaired.
This was a non-elimination leg.

Leg 5 (Malaysia → Sri Lanka)

Episode 5: "Can't Make Fish Bite" (March 23, 2014)
Prize:  each (awarded to Dave & Connor)
Eliminated: Margie & Luke
Locations
Gombak (Batu Caves – Lord Murugan Statue) 
 Kuala Lumpur → Colombo, Sri Lanka
Colombo (Gangaramaya Temple)
 Colombo → Galle
Koggala (King Coconut Stand)
Ahangama (Harbor  School) 
Nugegoda (Trendy Connections Garment Factory)  
Colombo (Colombo Rowing Club) 
Episode summary
At the beginning of this leg, teams were instructed to fly to Colombo, Sri Lanka. Once there, teams had to travel to the Gangaramaya Temple, where they dressed in traditional Buddhist robes before receiving a blessing from the head monk and their next clue. Teams were then directed to travel by train to Galle and find their next clue at the king coconut stand in Koggala.
 This leg's Detour was a choice between Fishing Pole or Spin Control. In Fishing Pole, teams had to climb up traditional fishing stilts from which they could fish. Once each team member caught a fish, they could exchange them for their next clue. In Spin Control, teams had to learn a traditional Kandyan dance and then perform it while balancing a spinning raban on a stick in order to receive their next clue.
 For their Speed Bump, Brendon & Rachel had to properly use silk screening to apply the final color to fifteen T-shirts bearing the flag of Sri Lanka before they could continue racing. 
 In this leg's Roadblock, one team member had to properly sew a shirt in a garment factory. Once the floor manager approved the work, he directed the team to a heat transfer machine, which printed the name of their next pit stop onto the shirt: the Colombo Rowing Club.
Additional notes
After missing their flight, Margie & Luke fell so far behind that all of the other teams had checked in at the pit stop by the time they arrived in Colombo. Though Margie & Luke traveled to all of the locations in Sri Lanka, they did not actually complete any of the tasks.

Leg 6 (Sri Lanka)

Episode 6: "Down and Dirty" (March 30, 2014)
Prize: A trip for two to Berlin, Germany (awarded to Leo & Jamal)
Locations
Colombo (Colombo Rowing Club) 
Colombo (Dutch Museum)
 Colombo → Alawwa
Alawwa (Ceypetco Fuel Station) 
 Alawwa → Rambukkana
Rambukkana (Millennium Elephant Foundation) 
Ambepussa (Ambepussa Rest House)
Mount Lavinia (Mount Lavinia Hotel - Beach) 
Episode summary
At the beginning of this leg, teams found their next clue at the Dutch Museum, which directed them to travel by train to Alawwa.
 In this leg's Roadblock, one team member had to choose a color badge in a gas station office and then search along a line of parked tuk-tuks for four that had the same color marked on their windshields.
After completing the Roadblock, teams had to travel by train to Rambukkana.
 This leg's Detour was a choice between Trunk or Sheets. In Trunk, teams worked with an elephant to load a truck with timber. After chaining a special knot to the larger pieces of timber so the elephant could lift it, the teams and the elephant had to each carry three logs to the truck. After giving their elephant palm leaves, the mahout gave teams their next clue. In Sheets, teams made paper using elephant dung. After collecting the dung in a wheelbarrow, teams took it to the paper mill, where it was mixed to make pulp. Teams then put the pulp on screens in order to make five sheets of paper. After teams laid five pre-made sheets out to dry, they received their next clue.
After completing the Detour, teams had to make their way to the Ambepussa Rest House and find the "wise man" and listen to his flute performance before receiving their next clue, which directed them to the pit stop: the beach at the Mount Lavinia Hotel.
Additional notes
This was a non-elimination leg.

Leg 7 (Sri Lanka → Italy)

Episode 7: "The Gladiators Are Here!" (April 13, 2014)
Prize: A trip for two to the Great Barrier Reef in Australia (awarded to Brendon & Rachel)
Eliminated: Jessica & John
Locations
Mount Lavinia (Mount Lavinia Hotel Beach) 
 Colombo → Rome, Italy
Rome (Hadrian's Bridge)
Rome (Pantheon & Monumento Nazionale a Vittorio Emanuele II) 
Rome (Parco del Celio  Parco del Colle Oppio) 
Rome (Piazza di Spagna) 
Rome (Spanish Steps) 
Rome (Piazza del Popolo) 
Episode summary
At the beginning of this leg, teams were instructed to travel to "The Eternal City" and find Hadrian's Bridge. Teams had to figure out that they needed to travel to Rome, Italy, and find the Ponte Sant'Angelo, where they found their next clue.
 This leg's Detour was a choice between Gladiator or Charioteer. For both Detour options, teams dressed in ancient Roman costumes. In Gladiator, teams learned a series of sword maneuvers to "battle" a seasoned gladiator in order to receive their next clue. If teams strayed from the battle sequence they were taught, they had to start over. In Charioteer, teams raced a radio-controlled chariot around a track with one team member controlling the speed and the other controlling the direction. Once teams completed five laps within one minute and thirty seconds, they received their next clue.
 For their Speed Bump, Caroline & Jennifer had to go to the Pantheon, pick up an antique typewriter, and drop it off at the Monumento Nazionale a Vittorio Emanuele II, before they could continue racing.
After completing the Detour, teams were told to visit the "piazza of John Keats' unhappy Roman Holiday", which they had figure out referred to the Piazza di Spagna at the base of the Spanish Steps. 
 In this leg's Roadblock, one team member had to get a postcard from a vendor and count total number of the Spanish Steps. They then had to add that total to the Roman numerals on the Obelisco Sallustiano in front of the Trinità dei Monti, which indicated its year of construction. They had to write down their sum in Roman numerals on the back of the postcard and show it to a pair of Gregory Peck and Audrey Hepburn impersonators at the top of the steps. If they had the correct answer, they received their next clue. Otherwise, they had to go back down to the vendor to get a new postcard and try again.
After the Roadblock, teams were told to head to "where the leg of the race ends and the Via Flaminia begins": the Piazza del Popolo.

Leg 8 (Italy)

Episode 8: "Donkeylicious" (April 20, 2014)
Prize:  each (awarded to Brendon & Rachel)
Eliminated: Flight Time & Big Easy
Locations
Rome (Villa Cagiati) 
Bagnoregio (Civita di Bagnoregio) 
Bagnoregio (Hostaria del Ponte) 
Orvieto (La Badia di Orvieto) 
 Orvieto (Orvieto Funicular)
Orvieto (Piazza del Duomo) 
Episode summary
At the beginning of this leg, teams had to drive themselves to Civita di Bagnoregio in the Italian countryside, where they found their next clue.
 This leg's Detour was a choice between Donkey Run or Donkey Build. In Donkey Run, teams had to choose a pair of donkeys and then participate in a traditional donkey race: the Palio della Tonna. If they could make three laps before the band stopped playing, they received their next clue. In Donkey Build, teams had to build a wooden donkey-shaped trolley using all of the pieces provided, load it with wood, and then deliver the wood to "Geppetto" in order to receive their next clue.
After completing the Detour, teams had to make their way to the Hostaria del Ponte in order to find their next clue.
 In this leg's Roadblock, one team member had to copy a page out of an illuminated manuscript, just as monks did before the invention of the printing press. Once they properly copied the page's calligraphy and gold leaf, they received their next clue.
After completing the Roadblock, teams had to ride the funicular to the pit stop at the Piazza del Duomo in Orvieto.
Additional notes
Jet & Cord used their Express Pass to bypass the Detour on this leg.
 This leg featured a Double U-Turn. Brendon & Rachel chose to use the U-Turn on Dave & Connor, while Dave & Connor chose to use the U-Turn on Leo & Jamal.

Leg 9 (Italy → Switzerland)

Episode 9: "Accidental Alliance" (April 27, 2014)
Prize: Pair of 2015 Ford Mustangs (awarded to Dave & Connor)
Locations
Orvieto (Piazza del Duomo) 
 Rome → Chiasso, Switzerland
Altdorf (Tell Monument)
Lucerne (Chapel Bridge)
Lucerne (Hotel Schweizerhof)
Lucerne (Swiss Museum of Transport)
Wolfenschiessen (Oberrickenbach)
 Wolfenschiessen (Bannalpsee) 
 Engelberg → Trübsee → Mount Titlis 
Episode summary
At the beginning of this leg, teams were instructed to travel by train to Chiasso, Switzerland. Once there, teams had to drive themselves to Altdorf and wait at the Tell Monument for a William Tell impersonator. When he arrived, he gave them their next clue, which directed them to find the oldest wooden bridge in Europe, the Chapel Bridge, where they found their next clue.
At the Hotel Schweizerhof, teams had to clean a room that they were told had been trashed by a rock band's party. After donning cleaning staff uniforms, they had to clean the room and set it to perfectly match an example room. Once the room was set properly, they received their next clue.
At the Swiss Museum of Transport, teams had search the grounds for a marked artifact and then figure out that it was a massive drill bit for a tunnel boring machine. Teams then had to search the museum for the Ford Mustang exhibit and pick a classic Mustang with their next clue, which instructed them to use the road signs on the museum's exhibit that listed distances to other Swiss cities and a formula included in their clue to calculate the model year of the Mustang they'd chosen. Once teams had the correct answer, they could receive their next clue, which directed them to travel to Oberrickenbach.
 In this leg's Roadblock, one team member had to pick a Bernese Mountain Dog with a cart containing two empty milk jugs and guide their dog to one of two gondola stations. After unloading the milk jugs and riding the gondola to the top station, they had to carry the milk jugs to a dairy farm and trade the empty jugs for full ones. They then had to carry the full jugs back to the gondola and down to their dog, before bringing the dog and full milk jugs to the milk truck, where they received their next clue.
Teams had to travel by gondola and check in at the pit stop at the top of Mount Titlis.
Additional notes
This was a non-elimination leg.

Leg 10 (Switzerland → Spain)

Episode 10: "Bull Down" (May 4, 2014)
Prize: A trip for two to Saint Croix (awarded to Dave & Connor)
Eliminated: Jet & Cord
Locations
Engelberg (Engelberg Cable Car Station) 
 Zürich → Seville, Spain
Seville (La Alameda – Statues of Hercules & Julius Caesar)
Seville (Melado Peluqueros) 
Seville (Real Alcázar – Patio de las Doncellas)
Seville (Las Teresas Café Bar) 
Seville (Museo del Baile Flamenco   Calle Lope de Rueda) 
Seville (General Archive of the Indies) 
Seville (Plaza de América) (Unaired)
Seville (Plaza de España) 
Episode summary
At the beginning of this leg, teams were instructed to fly to Seville, Spain. Once there, teams had to find a bugler playing "Reveille" beneath the statues of Hercules and Julius Caesar at La Alameda, where they received their next clue directing them to Melado Peluqueros.
 In this leg's Roadblock, one team member, paying homage to the opera The Barber of Seville, had to apply shaving cream to a balloon and then use a straight razor to remove all of the shaving cream within 60 seconds in order to receive their next clue. If they popped the balloon or ran out of time, they had to start over.
After completing the Roadblock, teams had to travel to the Patio de las Doncellas in Real Alcázar, where they received their next clue.
 For their Speed Bump, Caroline & Jennifer had to deliver six jamónes ibéricos through the streets and alleys of Seville to Las Teresas Café Bar before they could continue racing.
 This leg's Detour was a choice between Spanish Steps or Running with the Ballz. In Spanish Steps, teams had to learn a traditional flamenco routine and correctly perform it on stage in order to receive their next clue. In Running with the Ballz, teams wore Bumperz designed to look like bulls and ran through the streets of Seville, trying to avoid other "bulls" while looking for fragments of a motto printed on several posters along the route. Once teams reached the end of the course and could recite the full motto – "A matador never thinks about his own death" – they could receive their next clue.
After completing the Detour, teams had to make their way to the General Archive of the Indies in order to find their next clue, which directed them to check in at the pit stop: the Plaza de España in Seville.
Additional notes
 This leg featured a Double U-Turn. Leo & Jamal chose to use the U-Turn on Jet & Cord, while Caroline & Jennifer chose to use the U-Turn on Brendon & Rachel. However, Brendon & Rachel had already passed the U-Turn point and were therefore unaffected.
In an unaired segment, teams had to travel by horse-drawn carriage from the Plaza de América to the pit stop at the Plaza de España.

Leg 11 (Spain → England & Wales)

Episode 11: "Hei Ho Heidi Ho" (May 11, 2014)
Prize: A trip for two to Fiji (awarded to Dave & Connor)
Eliminated: Leo & Jamal
Locations
Seville (Plaza de España) 
 Seville → Madrid
 Madrid → London, England
Liverpool (Anfield – Anfield Stadium)
Froncysyllte, Wales (Pontcysyllte Aqueduct) 
Tattenhall, England (Bolesworth Estate) 
Peckforton (Peckforton Castle) 
Episode summary
At the beginning of this leg, teams were instructed to travel by train to Madrid and then fly to London, England. Once in London, teams had to drive themselves to the Anfield Stadium in Liverpool. There, each team member had to score two penalty kicks against a professional goalkeeper in order to receive their next clue.
 In this leg's Roadblock, one team member had to ride on one of the Pontcysyllte Aqueduct's canal boats and work with a Welsh language instructor to learn one verse of the Welsh poem "Y Sipsi!". After the 15-minute boat ride to the other side of the aqueduct, they had to recite the poem verbatim from memory in order to receive their next clue.
 This season's final Detour was a choice between Shoot It or Boot It. In Shoot It, teams participated in clay pigeon shooting using a 12-gauge shotgun and had to hit a total of 16 clay pigeons in order to receive their next clue. In Boot It, teams participated in boot throwing. After searching through a pile of Wellington boots to find a pair of either size 9 or size 11 boots, teams had to fill them with water and throw them along a course until they reached the finish line. At the end of the course, they received their next clue.
Teams had to check in at the pit stop: Peckforton Castle.

Leg 12 (England → United States)

Episode 12: "Do You Believe in Magic?" (May 18, 2014)
Winners: Dave & Connor
Second Place: Caroline & Jennifer
Third Place: Brendon & Rachel
Locations
Carden (Carden Park Luxury Hotel) 
 London → Las Vegas, Nevada
North Las Vegas (Desert)
Las Vegas (MGM Grand) 
Las Vegas (Neon Museum Boneyard)
Las Vegas  (The Mirage)
Henderson (Maverick Helicopters) 
Las Vegas (Las Vegas Motor Speedway) 
Episode summary
At the beginning of this leg, teams were instructed to fly to Las Vegas, Nevada. Once there, teams were driven to an isolated location in the desert, where their driver simply told the teams to get out of the car and dig. Teams eventually unearthed a box that said "Property of David Copperfield". After retrieving the box, they returned to the car and were driven to the MGM Grand.
 In this leg's first Roadblock, one team member had to participate in an illusion with David Copperfield. After opening up their box from the desert and retrieving the keys inside, the team member performing the Roadblock was shackled to the inside of a box. Once the box was closed, their partner handed them the keys through a hole in the box. Copperfield then escorted the teammate sitting out the Roadblock to a television monitor to watch their partner attempt the challenge. After the team member inside the box unlocked the shackles, they had to retrieve lock picks from the top of the box, after which the box was lifted off of the ground and lit on fire. Once the racer in the box said that they were done, their partner, under Copperfield's instruction, set off a series of switches that dropped the box into a burning pile of wood and set off a fiery explosion. Copperfield then informed the partner that they had to get the fire department's assistance, and the team member in the box appeared completely unharmed wearing a firefighter uniform. Copperfield then gave them their next clue.
After completing the Roadblock, teams were directed to the Neon Museum Boneyard. Their next clue instructed teams to remove a light bulb from a question mark sign and take it with them to The Mirage, where they were hoisted on a window-washing scaffold to one of the hotel's signs atop the tower. They had to replace all of the light bulbs in the sign's letter I. Once finished, they had to tell the employees how many bulbs they used in order to receive their next clue.
 In this season's final Roadblock, the team member who did not perform the previous Roadblock had to get in a helicopter and search the Las Vegas Strip for a sign at the Aria Resort and Casino that told them the name of their drop zone and location of the finish line: the Las Vegas Motor Speedway. After informing their pilot, they performed a tandem skydive  onto the racetrack's infield, where they joined their partner and crossed the finish line.

Reception

Critical response
The Amazing Race 24 received mostly negative reviews. The casting choices for this season were largely maligned with Andy Dehnart of reality blurred saying that "I couldn’t believe that these people were favorites, and collective reaction seemed to validate that." Daniel Fienberg of HitFix called this season horrible and a joke but acknowledged that he "didn't think that was an all-time bad 'Amazing Race' season. It had some good Legs and some good moments and it had a deserving winner." Reece Forward of Screen Rant  wrote that this season had "a sloppy all stars cast with lackluster tasks." In 2016, this season was ranked 26th out of the first 27 seasons by the Rob Has a Podcast Amazing Race correspondents. Conversely, Richard Gorelick, Chris Waldmann, and Melissa Wilson of The Baltimore Sun wrote "All in all, it was a pretty good season, with some impressively staged tasks." In 2022, Rhenn Taguiam of Game Rant ranked this season as the third-best season.

Ratings
No episode aired on April 6, 2014, due to the CBS broadcast of the Academy of Country Music Awards.

U.S. Nielsen ratings

 Episode 1, "Back in the Saddle", aired on the same night as the rebroadcast of the 2014 Winter Olympics closing ceremony.
 Episode 2, "Baby Bear's Soup", aired on the same night as the 86th Academy Awards.
 Episode 5, "Can't Make Fish Bite", was delayed by 41 minutes in the Eastern/Central market due to the 2014 NCAA Men's Division I Basketball Tournament's East Regional and Midwest Regional third round matches.
 Episode 6, "Down and Dirty", was delayed by 20 minutes in the Eastern/Central market due to the 2014 NCAA Men's Division I Basketball Tournament's East Regional Final and Midwest Regional Final matches.
 Episode 7, "The Gladiators Are Here!", was delayed by 11 minutes in the Eastern/Central market due to the final day of the 2014 Masters golf tournament.

U.S. DVR Ratings

Canadian ratings
Canadian broadcaster CTV also airs The Amazing Race on Sundays. Episodes air at 8:00 p.m. Eastern and Central (9:00 p.m. Pacific, Mountain and Atlantic), with four exceptions. The broadcast of the second episode conflicted with CTV's broadcast of the 86th Academy Awards; The Amazing Race was instead shown at 7:00 p.m. in the Atlantic time zone, at 6:00 p.m. in the Eastern time zone, and at 5:00 p.m. in the Central time zone, and immediately after the broadcast of the Oscars in the Pacific and Mountain time zones. The broadcast of the sixth episode conflicted with CTV's broadcast of the 2014 Juno Awards; The Amazing Race was instead shown at 7:00 p.m. in the Atlantic and Central time zones, at 8:00 p.m. in the Eastern and Mountain time zones, and at 9:00 p.m. in the Pacific time zone. The broadcast of the eleventh episode was rescheduled due to CTV's broadcast of the season finale of Once Upon a Time; The Amazing Race was instead shown at 8:00 p.m. in the Atlantic time zone, and at 7:00 p.m. in the rest of the country. The broadcast of the season finale conflicted with CTV's broadcast of the 2014 Billboard Music Awards; The Amazing Race was instead shown at 8:00 p.m. in the Atlantic time zone, and at 7:00 p.m. in the rest of the country.

Canadian DVR ratings are included in BBM Canada's count.

 Episode 1, "Back in the Saddle", aired on the same night as the rebroadcast of the 2014 Winter Olympics closing ceremony.
 Episode 12, "Do You Believe in Magic?", aired on the Sunday before Victoria Day.

References

External links

 24
Amazing Race 24, The
Television shows filmed in Santa Clarita, California
Television shows filmed in Los Angeles
Television shows filmed in China
Television shows filmed in Malaysia
Television shows filmed in Singapore
Television shows filmed in Sri Lanka
Television shows filmed in Italy
Television shows filmed in Switzerland
Television shows filmed in Spain
Television shows filmed in England
Television shows filmed in Wales
Television shows shot in the Las Vegas Valley